The Institute of Biochemistry, Molecular Biology and Biotechnology (IBMBB), Sri Lanka, is the National Node for European Molecular Biology Network (EMBnet) and is designated as a Resource Centre for Molecular Life Sciences by the International Programme in Chemical Sciences, University of Uppsala, Sweden.

External links 
Institute of Biochemistry, Molecular Biology and Biotechnology 

University of Colombo
Biochemistry research institutes
Research institutes in Sri Lanka